Athalaric (5162 October 534) was the king of the Ostrogoths in Italy between 526 and 534. He was a son of Eutharic and Amalasuntha, the youngest daughter of Theoderic the Great, whom Athalaric succeeded as king in 526.

As Athalaric was only ten years old, the regency was assumed by his mother, Amalasuntha. His mother attempted to provide for him an education in the Roman tradition, but the Gothic nobles pressured her to allow them to raise him as they saw fit. As a result, Athalaric drank heavily and indulged in vicious excesses, which ruined his constitution.

References

Sources

Further reading

 Letters of Cassiodorus, Book VIII from Project Gutenberg
 Procopius 'Wars' Book V, trans. H. P. Dewing
 Peter Heather, The Goths (Oxford, Blackwell, 1996).

516 births
534 deaths
6th-century kings of Italy
Ostrogothic kings
Amali dynasty
Ancient child monarchs
6th-century monarchs in Europe
6th-century Ostrogothic people